Patriots, also known as Revolutionaries, Continentals, Rebels, or American Whigs, were the colonists of the Thirteen Colonies who rejected British rule over the colonies. Patriots articulated the basis of opposition to British colonial rule and ultimately organized patriot militias, giving rise to the American Revolution, the issuance of the Declaration of Independence by the Second Continental Congress on July 4, 1776 in Philadelphia, and formalizing and escalating the American Revolutionary War between patriot forces, placed under the command of George Washington in 1775 and British military forces seeking to maintain the colonies as part of the British Empire. 

The thinking and actions of the patriots were largely inspired by the political philosophy of republicanism, which was articulated and advocated by Thomas Jefferson, John Adams, and Thomas Paine. They were opposed, in turn, by the Loyalists, who supported continued British rule over the colonies.

Patriots represented the spectrum of social, economic, and ethnic backgrounds. They included lawyers such as Adams, students such as Alexander Hamilton, planters such as Jefferson and George Mason, merchants such as Alexander McDougall and John Hancock, and farmers such as Daniel Shays and Joseph Plumb Martin. They also included slaves and freemen such as Crispus Attucks, who were some of the first casualties of the American Revolutionary War, which started with the Battles of Lexington and Concord on April 19, 1775 and culminated with the victory of the patriot forces, then known as the Continental Army and Continental Navy, in the Siege of Yorktown in 1781 and the formal establishment of American sovereignty and independence in the Treaty of Paris

Terminology

Whigs or Patriots
The critics of British policy towards the colonies called themselves "Whigs" after 1768, identifying with members of the British Whig party who favored similar colonial policies. Samuel Johnson writes that at the time, the word "patriot" had a negative connotation and was used as a negative epithet for "a factious disturber of the government".

"Tories" or "Royalists"
Prior to the Revolution, colonists who supported British authority called themselves Tories or royalists, identifying with the political philosophy of traditionalist conservatism dominant in Great Britain.  During the Revolution, these persons became known primarily as Loyalists.  Afterward, some 15% of Loyalists emigrated north to the remaining British territories in Canada.  There they called themselves the United Empire Loyalists. 85% of the Loyalists decided to stay in the new United States and were granted American citizenship.

Influence
Many Patriots were active before 1775 in groups such as the Sons of Liberty, and the most prominent leaders are referred to today by Americans as the Founding Fathers.  They represented a cross-section of the population of the Thirteen Colonies and came from many different backgrounds. According to Robert Calhoon, between 40 and 45 percent of the white population in the Thirteen Colonies supported the Patriots' cause, between 15 and 20 percent supported the Loyalists, and the remainder were neutral or kept a low profile.  The great majority of the Loyalists remained in America, while the minority went to Canada, Britain, Florida, or the West Indies.

Motivations

Patriot and Loyalist differences
Historians have explored the motivations that pulled men to one side or the other. Yale historian Leonard Woods Labaree used the published and unpublished writings and letters of leading men on each side, searching for how personality shaped their choice. He finds eight characteristics that differentiated the two groups.  Loyalists were older, better established, and more likely to resist innovation than the Patriots. Loyalists felt that the Crown was the legitimate government and resistance to it was morally wrong, while the Patriots felt that morality was on their side because the British government had violated the constitutional rights of Englishmen. Men who were alienated by physical attacks on Royal officials took the Loyalist position, while those who were offended by heavy-handed British response to actions such as the Boston Tea Party became Patriots.  Merchants in the port cities with long-standing financial attachments to Britain were likely to remain loyal to the system, while few Patriots were so deeply enmeshed in the system. Some Loyalists, according to Labaree, were "procrastinators" who believed that independence was bound to come some day, but wanted to "postpone the moment", while the Patriots wanted to "seize the moment". Loyalists were cautious and afraid of anarchy or tyranny that might come from mob rule; Patriots made a systematic effort to take a stand against the British government. Finally, Labaree argues that Loyalists were pessimists who lacked the Patriots' confidence that independence lay ahead.

Patriots and taxes

The Patriots rejected taxes imposed by legislatures in which the taxpayer was not represented. "No taxation without representation" was their slogan, referring to the lack of representation in the British Parliament. The British countered that there was "virtual representation" in the sense that all members of Parliament represented the interests of all the citizens of the British Empire. Some Patriots declared that they were loyal to the king, but they insisted that they should be free to run their own affairs. In fact, they had been running their own affairs since the period of "salutary neglect" before the French and Indian War. Some radical Patriots tarred and feathered tax collectors and customs officers, making those positions dangerous; according to Benjamin Irvin, the practice was especially prevalent in Boston where many Patriots lived.

List of prominent Patriots

See also 
 Loyalist (American Revolution)

References

Bibliography
Ellis, Joseph J. Founding Brothers: The Revolutionary Generation (2002), Pulitzer Prize
Kann, Mark E.; The Gendering of American Politics: Founding Mothers, Founding Fathers, and Political Patriarchy, (1999) online version
Middlekauff, Robert; The Glorious Cause: The American Revolution, 1763–1789 (2005) online version
Miller, John C. Origins of the American Revolution. (1943) online version
Miller, John C.  Triumph of Freedom, 1775–1783 (1948) online version
Previdi, Robert;  "Vindicating the Founders: Race, Sex, Class, and Justice in the Origins of America", Presidential Studies Quarterly, Vol. 29, 1999.
Rakove, Jack. Revolutionaries: A New History of the Invention of America (2010) excerpt and text search
Raphael, Ray. A People's History of the American Revolution: How Common People Shaped the Fight for Independence (2002).
Roberts, Cokie. Founding Mothers: The Women Who Raised Our Nation (2005).

1768 establishments in the Thirteen Colonies
1787 disestablishments in the United States

Tarring and feathering in the United States